The 2014 American raid in Libya refers to the capture of Ahmed Abu Khattala by U.S. troops and law enforcement agents during a late night raid in Libya. The raid was carried out on a coastal villa and seized Khattala before bringing him aboard a U.S. warship to be brought to the United States for legal proceedings.

Background
Ahmed Abu Khattala, a former prisoner under the Gaddafi regime and Ansar al-Sharia senior commander, was charged in a sealed indictment in August 2013 for his role in the attack on a U.S. diplomatic facility in Benghazi which killed four Americans, including the U.S. ambassador, J. Christopher Stevens. In 2013, Abu Anas al-Libi, a Libyan militant wanted for his role in the 1998 United States embassy bombings was seized in Tripoli by U.S. troops.

Raid

On the night of 14–15 June 2014, Abu Khattala was lured by an informant to an isolated coastal villa in Libya where he was seized by Delta Force operators and FBI agents. According to court records, Abu Khattala was armed with a handgun, violently resisted capture, and was wounded during the capture, requiring medical treatment. He was handcuffed, blindfolded, gagged, and earmuffed before being transported to the USS New York which transported him to Washington, D.C.

Aftermath

Abu Khattala was convicted on four terrorism-related charges in November 2017.

References

2014 in Libya
Operations involving American special forces